Tonquin Hill is located on the border of Alberta and British Columbia. It was named in 1916 by E. Deville.

See also
 List of peaks on the Alberta–British Columbia border
 Mountains of Alberta
 Mountains of British Columbia

References

Tonquin Hill
Tonquin Hill
Canadian Rockies